Alan N. Braverman is the former senior executive vice president, secretary and general counsel of The Walt Disney Company.

Early life and education
Braverman was raised in a Jewish family in Boston, Massachusetts, where his parents operated a children's clothing store. In 1969, he earned a B.A. degree from Brandeis University. After school, he worked as a VISTA volunteer in Gary, Indiana before returning to graduate school. In 1975, he received a J.D. degree summa cum laude from Duquesne University in Pittsburgh, where he was editor-in-chief of the Law Review.

Career
Braverman was promoted to executive vice president and general counsel, ABC, Inc., in May 2000 by Robert A. Iger, president of The Walt Disney Company, and was named executive vice president and general counsel of The Walt Disney Company in January 2003. In his role, Braverman oversaw the legal affairs of Disney, worldwide. Braverman stepped down from his position in early 2022.

Prior to his long tenure at ABC, Inc., Braverman worked at the Washington, D.C., law firm of Wilmer, Cutler & Pickering, where he started in 1976.  He was made a partner in 1983, specializing in commercial and administrative litigation. Braverman began his career as a law clerk to Thomas W. Pomeroy Jr., Justice of the Pennsylvania Supreme Court. Braverman is on the board of directors for the Constitutional Rights Foundation, and he had the honor of giving the Commencement Speech at his alma mater, Duquesne University School of Law, in June 2009.

References

External links
Corporate biography

American media executives
Brandeis University alumni
Disney executives
American Jews
Duquesne University School of Law alumni
Living people
Year of birth missing (living people)
Wilmer Cutler Pickering Hale and Dorr partners